This list contains musical instruments of symbolic or cultural importance within a nation, state, ethnicity, tribe or other group of people. 

In some cases, national instruments remain in wide use within the nation (such as the Puerto Rican cuatro), but in others, their importance is primarily symbolic (such as the Welsh triple harp). Danish ethnologist Lisbet Torp has concluded that some national instrument traditions, such as the Finnish kantele, are invented, pointing to the "influence of intellectuals and nationalists in the nationwide promotion of selected musical instruments as a vehicle for nationalistic ideas". Governments do not generally officially recognize national instruments; some exceptions being the Paraguayan harp, the Japanese koto and the Trinidadian steelpan.

This list compiles instruments that have been alleged to be a national instrument by any of a variety of sources, and an instrument's presence on the list does not indicate that its status as a national instrument is indisputable, only that its status has been credibly argued. Each instrument on this list has a Hornbostel-Sachs number immediately below it. This number indicates the instrument's classification within the Hornbostel-Sachs system (H-S), which organizes instruments numerically based on the manner in which they produce sound.

Images and recordings are supplied where available; note that there are often variations within a national musical tradition, and thus the images and recordings may not be accurate in depicting the entire spectrum of the given nation's music, and that some images and recordings may be taken from a region outside the core of the national instrument's home when such distinctions have little relevance to the information present in the image and recordings. A number of countries have more than one instrument listed, each having been described as a national instrument, not usually by the same source; neither the presence of multiple entries for one nation, nor for multiple nations for one instrument, on this list is reflective of active dispute in any instance. Alternative names and spellings are given. These mostly come from alternative spellings within English or alternative methods of transliterating from a foreign language to English, such as the Chinese yangqin, also transliterated yang ch'in and yang qin. Others reflect regions or subcultures within a given nation, such as the Australian didgeridoo which is or has been called didjeridu, yidaki, yiraki, magu, kanbi and ihambilbilg in various Australian Aboriginal languages. All non-English words are italicized.

References

Further reading
The following are specifically referenced above or are book-length or extended scholarly works documenting a specific national instrument, not including collections of songs.

African American: 
African American: 
African American: 
Argentina: 
Argentina: 
Argentina: 
Arab: 
Armenia: 
Australia: 
Australia: 
Baganda (Uganda): 
Bavaria: 
Brazil: 
Brazil: 
China: 
China: 
Finland: 
Ancient Greece: 
Guatemala: 
Guatemala: 
Guatemala: 
Hawaii: 
India: 
Ireland: 
Ireland: 
Ireland: 
Japan: 
Japan: 
Japan: 
Japan: 
Latvia: 
Lithuania: 
Mexico: 
Mexico: 
Mongolia: 
Mongolia: 
Norway: 
Norway: 
Norway: 
Portugal: 
Sardinia: 
Scotland: 
Scotland: 
Scotland: 
Scotland: 
Spain: 
Spain: 
Sweden: 
Switzerland: 
Trinidad and Tobago: 
Trinidad and Tobago: 
Wales: 
Wales: 
Zimbabwe: 
Zimbabwe: 

National instruments
Instruments